An iron ore car can be
 A gondola car
 An open wagon
 A hopper car